KWIL (790 AM, "KWIL For Christ") is a radio station licensed to serve Albany, Oregon, United States. The station is owned by Extra Mile Media, Inc.

Programming
KWIL broadcasts a religious radio format to the greater Corvallis, Oregon, area.  KWIL programming includes Christian ministry, religious education, and Bible teaching programs.

History
The station, the first licensed by the FCC to serve Albany, was owned and operated by the Central Willamette Broadcasting Company.

KWIL was acquired by Larry Gordon's Albany Radio Corporation on July 1, 1957.  Christian broadcaster Integrity Media acquired KWIL and KHPE, its FM sister station, in 1980.  Integrity Media changed its name to Extra Mile Media, Inc., in 2005.

Previous logo
 (KWIL's logo under previous "The Word" branding)

References

External links
FCC History Cards for KWIL
KWIL official website

Radio stations established in 1941
Albany, Oregon
1941 establishments in Oregon
WIL